Swaziland is represented at the 2006 Commonwealth Games in Melbourne by a xx-member strong contingent comprising xx sportspersons and xx officials.

Medals

Bronze
 Simanga Shiba, Boxing, Light Flyweight 48 kg

SWaz006
Nations at the 2006 Commonwealth Games
Commonwealth Games